Tall Heydari or Tol-e Heydari may refer to:
 Tall Heydari, Jahrom
 Tol-e Heydari, Mamasani